Sables-Spanish Rivers is a township in Ontario, Canada, on the north shore of Georgian Bay.

The township was created in 1998 by amalgamating the former towns of Massey and Webbwood with the township of Spanish River and the unorganized geographic townships of May and Shakespeare, and was named for Massey's location at the junction of the Spanish and Aux Sables rivers.

The township's population was 3,214 in the Canada 2016 Census. The municipal offices are located in Massey.

Communities
Massey is located at the junction of the aux Sables and Spanish Rivers,  close to the northern shore of Lake Huron. Chutes Provincial Park is one of its principal attractions. Massey is one of several sites that claim to be the home of broomball.

Walford is the westernmost community of the township located along Highway 17. Its economy was primarily based on logging and mining. The old Walford fire tower still stands north of the village on Tube Lake.

Webbwood was incorporated as a town in 1906.

The hamlet of Lee Valley is divided between the municipalities of Sables-Spanish Rivers and Espanola.

Demographics 

Transportation

All three of the township's main communities are located directly along .

All three communities sit along the Huron Central Railway, and once had Canadian Pacific Railway stations. Webbwood was once a divisional point on the Canadian Pacific Railway's Sudbury–Soo Line, with the Webbwood Subdivision to the east and the Thessalon Subdivision to the west. As steam engines were phased out, Canadian Pacific no longer needed as many divisional points for refueling and repair, so its importance as a station declined and the station was eventually removed.

Massey and Webbwood are both stops on Ontario Northland's Sault Ste. Marie–Ottawa motor coach route.

The Great Lakes Waterfront Trail, a part of the Trans Canada Trail, passes through the township. Travelling from Spanish in the west, the trail enters the township following DeClerk Road and Menard Crescent on gravel before following the route of Highway 17 along a paved shoulder. At Walford, it dips south to follow the gravel route of River Road parallel and to the north of the Spanish River. Upon reaching Massey, it passes through the south of the town before continuing along Lee Valley Road toward Lee Valley.

Media

The township is served primarily by media from Sudbury, Elliot Lake, Espanola and Little Current.

In 1995, The Canadian Wildlife Experience Inc. received a licence to operate a new low-power tourist information radio station to serve Massey, Walford and Spanish, Ontario at 98.5 MHz, during the spring, summer and fall seasons. The call letters were CJWE-FM. It is uncertain if the station is still currently in operation.

Culture
The community hosts an annual fair in late August, which celebrated its 100th anniversary in 2006.

Massey holds a fall fair every year at the fairgrounds. There are rides, contests, prizes, many games and even more vendors. A crash-up car derby has been recently been added along with a four-wheeler mud bog competition. In 2008, the classic car show at the fair was very small compared to the years before so it may be cancelled. There are motocross races, horse pulls, and horse shows there as well.

Famous people
The citizens of Webbwood elected Canada's first female mayor, Barbara Hanley, in 1936.

Massey is the birthplace of artist Robert Lougheed and former NHLer Pete Horeck. It is also the hometown of writer and former bank robber Stephen Reid and the current home of poet Charlie Smith.

Theodore Drake, one of the inventors of Pablum, was born at Webbwood.

Recreation and sports
The Massey District Community Centre and Arena is located in Massey, and plays host to the Massey Predators Minor Hockey Association and the Massey and District Figure Skating Club. The Massey Marathon is held annually using the arena as a centre for registration and award ceremony. The marathon is now in its 33rd year and is a qualifier for the Boston Marathon. The township is also the home of Chutes Provincial Park.

See also
List of townships in Ontario
List of francophone communities in Ontario

References

External links

Municipalities in Sudbury District
Single-tier municipalities in Ontario
Township municipalities in Ontario